Aydin Onur (29 October 1934 – 1 August 2016) was a Turkish sprinter.

References

1934 births
2016 deaths
Athletes (track and field) at the 1960 Summer Olympics
Turkish male sprinters
Olympic athletes of Turkey
20th-century Turkish people